Nicolas Pierre-Jules Delespine (31 October 1756, Paris – 16 September 1825, Paris) was a French architect.

Biography 
He came from a long line of architects, which included his father, Louis-Jules Delespine (1726-1796).

From 1800 until his death, he was a professor at the École des beaux-arts, and served as a member of the École's jury. His workshop enjoyed a high reputation.

He was a member of the Council for Civic Buildings and, in 1824, became a member of the Académie des Beaux-Arts. There, he took Seat #1 for architecture, succeeding Maximilien Joseph Hurtault, deceased.

Sources 
 Charles Gabet, Dictionnaire des artistes de l'école française au XIXe siècle, pp. 195–196}}, chez Madame Vergne, Paris, 1831 (Online)
 Adolphe Lance, Dictionnaire des architectes français, Vol.1, A - K, pg.204, Vve A. Morel et Cie éditeurs, Paris, 1872 
 Charles Bauchal, Nouveau dictionnaire biographique et critique des architectes français, pg.638, A. Daly fils et Cie, Pris, 1887

1756 births
1825 deaths
Architects from Paris
Members of the Académie des beaux-arts